Vasishta Niranjan Simha is an Indian actor and playback singer who primarily appears in Kannada films. He is well known for villain roles, including the role of Kamal in K.G.F.

Early life 
Vasishta from Mysore, studied in Sharada Vilas School and Sadvidhya School. He did his PUC in Sri Sai Sathya Narayana pu college Banaswadi. Grabbing an opportunity to work with the music legend, Hamsalekha. He shifted base to Bengaluru and completed his graduation from National College, Basavanagudi.

Career 
In 2011, Vasishta quit his job as a software engineer and decided to enter the Kannada film industry as an actor. He initially worked on an unreleased film titled Hubballi Hudagaru, before having his first release with Arya's Love (2013). He subsequently made a breakthrough with his role as the main antagonist in Raja Huli (2013), a remake of the Tamil film, Sundarapandian (2012). He later also appeared in Rudra Tandava (2014), a remake of the Tamil film Pandiya Naadu (2013).

Vasishta then appeared in JKS's bilingual film, Alone, in a leading role alongside Nikesha Patel. Portraying the male lead, the film won mixed reviews and the actor managed to get an introduction into the Tamil film industry. He made his Telugu debut with the film Narappa in 2021. But Vasishta's fame and fanbase raised more and more after he play an important role in K.G.F, where Vasishta played the role of bangalore-based gangster Kamal, one of the major antagonist in the film.

Filmography

As playback singer

Awards

References 

Living people
Male actors in Tamil cinema
Male actors in Kannada cinema
Indian male film actors
Tamil male actors
Kannada male actors
Filmfare Awards South winners
Kannada playback singers
Singers from Bangalore
Film musicians from Karnataka
21st-century Indian singers
Male actors from Bangalore
21st-century Indian male actors
Year of birth missing (living people)
Male actors in Telugu cinema